"My Big John" is a song written by Jean Dean, Ira Louvin and Charlie Louvin of the Louvin Brothers, and J. Newman.

The song was recorded by American country music artist Dottie West, as an answer song to Jimmy Dean's hit "Big Bad John".  It was released in October 1961 as her third release on Starday Records. The B-side is a track tilted, "Men With Evil Hearts"

Song Background  
The song is told from the point of view of the "Cajun Queen" that drove John away – her search for him, then discovering about his death.

References

1961 songs
1961 singles
Answer songs
Dottie West songs
Starday Records singles
Songs written by Ira Louvin
Songs written by Charlie Louvin